Quercus nigra, the water oak, is an oak in the red oak group (Quercus sect. Lobatae), native to the eastern and south-central United States, found in all the coastal states from New Jersey to Texas, and inland as far as Oklahoma, Kentucky, and southern Missouri.

Other names include spotted oak, duck oak, punk oak, orange oak, and possum oak.

Description
Young trees have a smooth, brown bark that becomes gray-black with rough scaly ridges as the tree matures. The margins vary, usually being smooth to shallowly lobed, with a bristle at the apex and lobe tips. The tree is easy to identify by the leaves, which have a lobe that looks as if a drop of water is hanging from the end of the leaf. The top of each leaf is a dull green to bluish green and the bottom is a paler bluish-green. On the bottom portion of the leaves, rusty colored hairs run along the veins.

Ecology

Water oak serves the same ecological role as weeping willow and other wetland trees. It is adapted to wet, swampy areas, such as along ponds and stream banks, but can also tolerate well-drained sites and even heavy, compacted soils. It grows in sandy soils, red clays, and old fields to the borders of swamps, streams, to bottomlands. Due to its ability to grow and reproduce quickly, the water oak is often the most abundant species in a stand of trees. The tree is relatively short-lived compared to other oaks and may live only 60 to 80 years. It does not compete well and does not tolerate even light shade. Water oak is frequently used to restore bottomland hardwood forests on land that was previously cleared for agriculture or pine plantations. Minimum age for flowering and fruiting is 20 years and the tree produces heavy crops of acorns nearly every year. Water oak is not recommended as an ornamental due to being short-lived, disease-prone, and extremely messy.

Hybrids of water oak are known with southern red oak (Quercus falcata), bluejack oak (Quercus incana), turkey oak (Quercus laevis), blackjack oak (Quercus marilandica), willow oak (Quercus phellos), Shumard oak (Quercus shumardii), and black oak (Quercus velutina).

Water oak acorns are an important food for white-tailed deer, eastern gray squirrel, raccoon, wild turkey, mallard, wood duck, and bobwhite quail. In winter, deer will browse the buds and young twigs.

Uses
Water oak has been used for timber and for fuel by people in the southern states since the 17th century. The wood is generally sold as "red oak", mixed with the wood from other red oaks.

References

External links

 C. Michael Hogan (ed.)(2011). "Quercus nigra. Encyclopedia of Life. Contributor Missouri Botanical Gardens 
 United States Department of Agriculture, National Forest Service

photo of herbarium specimen at Missouri Botanical Garden, collected in Missouri in 1948

nigra
Flora of the Eastern United States
Trees of the Southeastern United States
Trees of the South-Central United States
Plants described in 1753
Taxa named by Carl Linnaeus
Plant dyes